Wazaa FM is a privately owned radio station based in Mauritius which started operation in May 2019. It is one of the recent radio stations with a Private Commercial Free to Air FM Radio Broadcasting Licence issued by the Independent Broadcasting Authority-Mauritius.

Wazaa FM claims to be a "feel good" radio station offering listeners more hits and popular music with an entertainment and good humor factor. The genre of broadcast music is mostly Bollywood but they also offer much of their airtime to promoting local talents and artists.

Programs
Wazaa FM shows vary from entertainment ones to addressing more important societal issues, recent happenings and addressing individual concerns. Recent additions to the shows also show they're giving focus to health related issues thereby diversifying the type of shows on air.

On weekdays (Monday-Friday) 
 Devotional Hour with Isha
 Subha ka Tara with Sobhanund
 Wazaa Breakfast Club with Tanisha et Jerry 
 Mid Morning Show With Kesaven
 Bollywood ka Dhaba with Pinky Rajpal
 Skip the Traffic with Manishma
 The Wow Show with Nishi
 Desi Nights with DJ Vakil
 Feel Good Weekend with Alain
 Midnight Club with Narvesh 
 Confluence with Sarvesh and Danielle
 Wazaa Sante with Dhiren et Dr Sandip
 Tibiznes dan Moris with Krsna and Diana

On Weekends :
Feel Good Weekend With Joshua 
Bouz lor Wazaa With Alain
Feel Good Weekend With Pinky

Feel Good Weekend With Kesaven
Feel Good Weekend With Manishma

Feel Good Local Music With Narvesh
Feel Good Sunday With Narvesh

Other shows on weekdays 
 Ena Simé (Wednesdays) with Dhiren and Sarvesh 
 Ansam Ansam (Thursdays) with Krsna Coopoosamy & Girty Eleonore
 L'Instant Polique (Fridays) with Jimmy Jean Louis

Popularity
Wazaa FM is one of the youngest and newest additions to the privately owned radio stations but is also very popular among the local audience. Within a year of existence, they have a following of around 137k on Facebook with a very active fan base.

They have also been documented participating in quite a bit of social work including blood donations, job fairs, health check-ups and much more.

See also
 List of radio stations in Mauritius

References 

Radio stations in Mauritius
Radio stations established in 2019
Ebene, Mauritius